The Centre for Alternative Technology (CAT) is an eco-centre in Powys, mid-Wales, dedicated to demonstrating and teaching sustainable development. CAT, despite its name, no longer concentrates its efforts exclusively on alternative technology, but provides information on all aspects of sustainable living. It is open to visitors, offers postgraduate degrees as well as shorter residential and one day courses; and publishes information on renewable energy, sustainable architecture, organic farming, gardening, and sustainable living. CAT also runs education programmes for schools and sells environmentally friendly items through its on site shop, restaurant and mail order department.

History

CAT was founded by businessman-turned-environmentalist Gerard Morgan-Grenville, and opened in 1973 in the disused Llwyngwern slate quarry near Machynlleth (once served by the narrow-gauge Corris Railway), where it occupies a seven-acre (28,000 m2) site. The organisation was originally known as the "British National Centre for the development of Alternative Technology". Inspiration for the early CAT pioneers included the then-recent books Small Is Beautiful, A Blueprint for Survival, and The Limits to Growth as well as an aim to explore alternative ways of living.

CAT was previously aligned to the Urban Centre for Appropriate Technology (UCAT), which was based in Bristol and has since evolved into the Centre for Sustainable Energy.

David Lea and Pat Borer won the Gold Medal for Architecture at the National Eisteddfod of Wales of 2001 for their work on the WISE building at the CAT.

Visitor centre 
In 1975 a permanent exhibition opened in order to generate wider interest. It is open all-year except Christmas, seven days a week. It is a registered charity.

The facilities and exhibits include: 
the water-balanced CAT funicular, the Centre for Alternative Technology Railway
solar, hydropower and wind power
a low-energy house
a site-wide electricity grid powered by renewable energy
displays of organic gardening methods
a hydraulic ram pump
strawbale and rammed earth buildings
 Britain's largest green bookshop
 Vegetarian/vegan restaurant
 Events, activities and courses that take place throughout the year

Education 

The centre offers a range of courses which are between a day and a week in length. Some of these courses are offered to the general public while others are accredited courses for professional installers. CAT is involved with school education through training teachers, producing materials and offering special tours and materials on site.

The Centre includes a Graduate School of the Environment. It offers postgraduate courses in renewable energy, architecture and environmental studies.

Since 2008, the centre has run a Professional Diploma in Architecture course in Advanced Environmental and Energy Studies, which allows students to obtain an accredited Part II architectural qualification.

Wales Institute for Sustainable Education

In summer 2010, CAT inaugurated the Wales Institute for Sustainable Education (WISE), a large educational building designed as a case study of sustainable architecture. The building contains a lecture theatre and accommodation and demonstrates ecological building principles such as passive solar building design and heat recovery ventilation as well as low-impact building materials such as wood, hemp, lime and rammed earth. The external walls of the building are made from 500mm thick hempcrete, whereas the lecture theatre has 7.2m high walls made from 320t of rammed earth.

A building management system is used to monitor a wide variety of parameters inside the building, providing data for research projects by CAT's sustainable architecture students. The building is used for teaching postgraduate degrees and short courses and is also available as a conference venue and exhibition space.

In 2010 the WISE building was awarded the first place in The Daily Telegraph'''s list of Top 10 Buildings 2010 and came fourth in The Guardian Top 10'' list of buildings for 2010. It received a Royal Institute of British Architects (RIBA) Award in 2011.

Energy 
CAT originally relied on a collection of water, wind and solar power, but following power shortages it began to receive power from the National Grid. Shortly afterwards, in 2004, a large new wind turbine was built using funds generated by selling shares in the project to the community, Bro Dyfi Community renewables. From 2009 September onwards CAT has operated a microgrid system, which includes elements of on- and off-grid operation.

CAT gets its water from an existing man-made reservoir in the slate quarry in which it is based and processes its own sewage in its reedbeds.

Regional impact 
The presence of the Centre in the Dyfi Valley has brought an increased environmental emphasis to the area, which is now designated as a UNESCO Biosphere Reserve. In the nearest town, Machynlleth, CAT plc formerly operated a wholefood vegetarian café and a separate shop.  Following the closure of CAT plc the CAT charity retained ownership of the vegetarian cafe but subsequently sold it to its workers.  The cafe is now run as a private enterprise but continues to operate as a vegetarian cafe. The wholefood shop was closed, since the building was not owned by CAT.  However a new wholefood shop, Dyfi Wholefoods, was opened by the staff who were made redundant. An industrial estate (the Dyfi Eco Park) near Machynlleth railway station houses the offices of Dulas Ltd, a renewable-energy company founded by ex-CAT employees.

See also
Centre for Appropriate Rural Technology
Diggers and Dreamers

References

External links 

 CAT's Zero Carbon Britain project

1973 establishments in Wales
Appropriate technology organizations
Architecture schools in Wales
Buildings and structures in Powys
Charities based in Wales
Conservation in Wales
Energy conservation in the United Kingdom
Environmental technology
Low-energy building
Organic gardening
Permaculture organizations
Education in Powys
Renewable energy organizations
Sustainable design
Sustainable technologies
Sustainability in the United Kingdom
Horticultural organisations based in the United Kingdom
Machynlleth
Welsh Eisteddfod Gold Medal winners